Erythrinus is a genus of relatively small trahiras, freshwater fish from tropical South America.

Species
There are currently two recognized species in this genus, but a possibly undescribed species is known from the lower Paraná basin and Iguazu basin.

 Erythrinus erythrinus (Bloch & J. G. Schneider, 1801)
 Erythrinus kessleri Steindachner, 1877

References

Erythrinidae
Taxa named by Giovanni Antonio Scopoli